Kerry Thomas Diotte (born 1956) is a Canadian journalist and former politician who was the member of Parliament (MP) for Edmonton Griesbach from 2015 to 2021 and sat on the Edmonton City Council from 2010 to 2013. A Conservative, Diotte was elected to the House of Commons twice–in the 2015 and 2019 elections–but would lose his seat to New Democratic Party (NDP) candidate Blake Desjarlais in 2021. He ran for mayor of Edmonton in 2013, placing third. In June 2022 he joined Rebel News to become their Alberta Legislature reporter and political correspondent.

Early life and career
Diotte was born in Sault Ste. Marie, Ontario, on February 26, 1956. He was educated at Carleton University in Ottawa, Ontario.

Diotte was employed at the Edmonton Sun from 1985 until October 2009 where he worked as Legislature bureau chief, as well as a copy editor, reporter, and assignment editor. Prior to that, he worked for the Calgary Sun and newsmagazines, including Alberta Report and Maclean's. He has also worked for a Canadian Broadcasting Corporation affiliate where he was an on-camera television reporter. For many years, Diotte was president of the Edmonton chapter of the Canadian Association of Journalists and a national director of the organization. He resigned those positions to campaign for a city council seat in the 2010 Edmonton municipal election.

2004 police sting

On November 18, 2004, seven members of the Edmonton Police Service targeted Diotte along with then-police commission chairman Martin Ignasiak in a controversial undercover drunk-driving operation at an Edmonton bar, the Overtime Broiler & Taproom. Police were staked out in anticipation of catching the two men driving home drunk, but both took cabs home.

Subsequent legal proceedings produced evidence, including police radio conversations from that night, showing officers set up the operation because they were upset by Diotte's newspaper columns about policing, including criticism of photo radar operations. After an internal police investigation exonerated the officers involved in the unwarranted would-be sting, then-police chief Fred Rayner was fired from his position by the Edmonton Police Commission.

In September 2008, Alberta's Law Enforcement Review Board ruled a senior police officer abused his power by targeting Diotte because the law enforcement official was frustrated by the columnist's viewpoints on police matters. The panel decided there was "no credible evidence" to suggest Diotte would drive drunk when leaving the November 18, 2004 function and noted the journalist has no criminal record. In the decision, the panel chair wrote: "Mr. Diotte had the right, without fear of police reprisal, to freedom of speech, which includes the freedom to write critical articles about policing in his community."

Political career

Municipal politics 
Diotte ran for city council in the 2010 Edmonton municipal election, winning Ward 11 with 44.3% of the vote. On May 16, 2013, Diotte announced his candidacy for the mayoralty of Edmonton. He finished in third with 32,917 votes.

Member of Parliament 
On February 26, 2014, Diotte announced his intention to seek the Conservative Party of Canada nomination in the new federal riding of Edmonton Griesbach. Diotte won the nomination election on December 6, 2014. In the 2015 election, Diotte won the seat, defeating his closest opponent, Janis Irwin, by less than 3,000 votes.

On September 15, 2016, he was appointed deputy critic of Urban Affairs in Interim Conservative leader Rona Ambrose's shadow cabinet.

Diotte was a member of the Standing Joint Committee for the Scrutiny of Regulations in the 42nd Parliament.

He was appointed in September 2018 as a member of the Standing Committee on Human Resources, Skills and Social Development and the Status of Persons with Disabilities.

Diotte sponsored private member's Bill C-306, An Act to establish a Crimean Tatar Deportation ("Sürgünlik") Memorial Day and to recognize the mass deportation of the Crimean Tatars in 1944 as an act of genocide. This bill sought to recognize the mass deportations of Crimean Tatars in 1944 by the Soviet Union as genocide and establish May 18 as a day of commemoration. Bill C-306 was defeated at second reading.

Diotte was appointed Deputy Shadow Minister for Public Services and Procurement in Opposition Leader Andrew Scheer's shadow cabinet.

On February 6, 2020, Diotte voted in support of Bill C-233 – an act to amend the Criminal Code (sex-selective abortion), which would make it an indictable or a summary offence for a medical practitioner to knowingly perform an abortion solely on the grounds of the child's genetic sex.

On October 28, 2020, Diotte voted in favour of Bill C-6 in the second reading, which proposed amending the Criminal Code to include a ban on conversion therapy. However, on June 21, 2021, he voted against the bill during the third reading, expressing concerns that the legislation wasn't worded precisely enough to exclude certain conversations in religious counselling. After losing his seat in the 2021 Canadian federal election, the amendment passed in the first session of the next Parliament in Bill C-4.

Diotte lost his Edmonton-Griesbach seat to the NDP's Blake Desjarlais in the 2021 federal election. MLA Janis Irwin attributed  Diotte's loss to anger directed towards the Conservative Party due to their actions federally – such as Diotte's vote against the conservation therapy ban – and their association with the unpopular United Conservative Party (UCP) government provincially. As well, growing support of the People's Party voters siphoned off support from the Conservatives.

Controversy 
On November 19, 2018, Diotte launched a lawsuit against University of Alberta student publication The Gateway for publishing two articles that the suit deemed "defamatory", objecting to claims that he is racist. The Gateway issued a quick apology and retraction, stating: "That characterization of Mr. Diotte is false, damaging to his reputation, and caused Mr. Diotte and his family unwarranted embarrassment. The Gateway sincerely apologizes to Mr. Diotte for this wrongful characterization and retracts the offending articles." In a statement, Diotte stated that he was “glad that my lawyer and theirs could come to a mutually agreeable solution without a protracted court fight,” and that he was “a strong believer in free speech, but it’s important to remember there are legal lines that can’t be crossed.”

Electoral history

References

External sources
 Official website
 Law Enforcement Review Board decision 002-2008

1956 births
Canadian male journalists
Carleton University alumni
Edmonton city councillors
Journalists from Alberta
Journalists from Ontario
Living people
People from Sault Ste. Marie, Ontario
Conservative Party of Canada MPs
Members of the House of Commons of Canada from Alberta
Canadian columnists
21st-century Canadian politicians